Östersund Municipality is a municipality in Jämtland County in northern Sweden. Its seat is located in Östersund, which is also the county seat of Jämtland County.

The present municipality was formed in 1971 by the amalgamation of the City of Östersund with five surrounding rural municipalities.

Localities
There are ten localities (or urban areas) in Östersund Municipality:

The municipal seat in bold

Politics and governance
Swedish municipalities are responsible for government-mandated duties, and elections for the municipal council (kommunfullmäktige) are held every four years, parallel to the general elections.

Political history
Östersund gained a city council (stadsfullmäktige) in 1863, known as Östersunds stad, and each member was elected through a single-winner voting system. Sweden was democratized in the end of the 1910s and a more parliamentarian election system was introduced. Östersund continued to be governed by the burghers, unlike Sweden nationally. The dominating parties were the conservatives, the freeminded and the social democrats. The latter did become the single largest party in 1938 but due to a strong centre-right majority it remained in opposition. The only other party present in Östersund was the communists, though they had little support in the city, having entered the city council in 1922 and lost representation completely in 1930. The conservatives was by far the largest party and had a majority of its own with 18 seats in 1922. After the municipal elections of 1950 the situation had changed. The conservatives was the smallest party with 10 seats, the liberals (now represented by the Liberal People's party) had 11 and the social democrats 19. This was in contrast to the turnout on a national level, where the social democrats had been the dominant party for over a decade gaining e.g. 46 percent of the votes in the general elections of 1948. In 1952 a social democrat was appointed chairman of Östersund's governing body, due to the lack of political blocs and the strive for mutual agreements.

A majority for the social democrats was achieved first in 1962. The political scene was shortly afterwards altered, in 1966, when the agrian and rural Centre Party (previously known as Peasant's League) got into the city council, after broadening its scope to include non-farmers, alongside the Christian Democrats (though not present on the national political scene) and the communists returning after a 40-year period of absence. The burghers was thus back in power. Following the rise of Swedish welfare the small municipalities could not cope with their assigned duties. As a result, large municipality blocks were introduced and Östersunds stad was heavily enlarged and several districts kilometres away from the city were included in the new Östersund Municipality.

The first election for the new municipality was held in 1970 and it was a large success for the Centre Party, both locally in Östersund and nationally due to its opposition towards centralisation. Having entered in 1966 with 4 seats it now possessed one fourth of the total number of seats (which was mainly due to support from the city, not the newly included rural areas). Block politics formation became prominent and the Centre Party became the leading party for the centre-right block, whilst the Social Democrats came to dominate the left block. The Social Democrats regained power in 1980 and has since governed Östersund Municipality until present day (excluding a brief period in the 1990s) supported by the communists (after 1991 known as the Left Party) and occasionally the Green Party. The Green Party has been in the municipal council since 1982.

2006 elections
In preparation for the 2006 municipal elections the centre-right parties in the opposition were joined, following the example done nationally with Alliance for Sweden as Alliance for Östersund. The Green Party did not want to pick a side between the Alliance and the ruling left block. This later gave the Green Party the opportunity to support either side. After negotiations the party chose to support the left block, just like it did 1998–2002. Jens Nilsson from the Social Democratic Party is the mayor of Östersund and has been so since 1997.

See also
List of governors of Jämtland County
Rensved
Swedish Armed Forces
Swedish Air Force
Biathlon World Championships

References

External links

Östersund Municipality - Official site

 
Municipalities of Jämtland County
Östersund